The following is a list of video games based on the American entertainment and merchandising franchise of the same name by Haim Saban. The games have been primarily licensed to be published under Bandai, THQ, Disney Interactive, Bandai Namco Entertainment and Lionsgate Games

List of games 

Additionally, the 2015 indie tactical RPG Chroma Squad is inspired by Power Rangers.

References

Video games
Power Rangers video games
Lists of video games by franchise